Wat Hua Lamphong is a Royal Buddhist temple, third class, in the Bang Rak District of Bangkok, Thailand.

It is located on Rama IV Road, with Si Lom Road and Suriwong Road in Bangkok's modern business district to the southeast, and Si Phraya Road to the northwest. It is a block from The Montien hotel, and approximately 1 km from the city's main Hua Lamphong railway station. An entrance to Sam Yan Station on the Bangkok metro is located outside the main entrance to the temple compound on Rama IV road.

History
Wat Hua Lamphong was renovated to celebrate the 50th anniversary of the ascension to the throne of King Bhumibol Adulyadej (Rama IX) in 1996. The royal seal of what became known as the Kanchanapisek, or Golden Jubilee, year, showing two elephants flanking a multi-tiered umbrella, features extensively in the temple's remodelling.

Style and Layout

Inside the temple compound, the ubosot and viharn are unusual in being raised on a one-story high platform, accessed by a wide staircase. The platform also supports the temple's chedi.

The compound in front of and below the ubosot platform is home to a number of shrines dedicated to important Thai Buddhist figures, including King Chulalongkorn (Rama V), and the Hindu god Ganesha.

The temple compound also contains a crematorium, and living quarters for monks.

See also

List of Buddhist temples in Thailand

References

External links

 Photos of Wat Hua Lamphong at Thailand-pictures.com

Hua Lamphong
Bang Rak district
Thai Theravada Buddhist temples and monasteries
Unregistered ancient monuments in Bangkok